Within the American Federal Bureau of Investigation, the National Security Law Unit forms part of the Office of the General Counsel It was previously led by Michael J. Woods.

See also 
 FBI National Security Branch

References

Federal Bureau of Investigation